Recio, Recio Mis Creadorez (Eng.: Hurry, Hurry My Creators) is the title of a studio album released by Chicago-based ensemble Los Creadorez del Pasito Duranguense de Alfredo Ramírez. This album became their first number-one set on the Billboard Top Latin Albums, and was released in a standard CD presentation and as a CD/DVD combo.

Track listing
The track listing from Billboard and Allmusic.

Collector's Edition

Personnel
This information from Allmusic.
Alfredo Ramírez Corral — Clarinet, guitar, arranger, keyboards, engineer, executive producer, digital mastering, mixing
Jesús Ortiz — Engineer, mixing
Armando Aguirre Ramírez — Percussion, tambora

Chart performance

Year-End Charts

Sales and certifications

References

2007 debut albums
Los Creadorez del Pasito Duranguense de Alfredo Ramírez albums
Disa Records albums